Alison McEvoy Campbell (born 13 October 1991) is an indoor and field hockey player from the United States.

Personal life
Ali Campbell was born and raised in Bryn Mawr, Pennsylvania.

In 2013, Campbell completed a bachelor's degree in family sciences at the University of Maryland.

Career

Indoor
In 2008, Campbell made her debut for the United States Indoor team at the 2008 Indoor Pan American Cup in San Juan.

Throughout her indoor career, Campbell has medalled with the team at four Indoor Pan American Cups, winning gold in 2017 and 2021, silver in 2008 and bronze in 2010. In 2021 she became captain of the team.

Campbell was also a member of the team at the 2018 Indoor World Cup in Berlin.

Field hockey
As well as indoor hockey, Campbell also plays field hockey for the United States national team. She debuted in 2014, and has gone on to represent the team in several tournaments since.

Her most notable performance with the team was during season two of the FIH Pro League.

References

External links

1991 births
Living people
Female field hockey defenders
American female field hockey players
2018 FIH Indoor Hockey World Cup players